The 1988 German motorcycle Grand Prix was the sixth round of the 1988 Grand Prix motorcycle racing season. It took place on the weekend of 27–29 May 1988 at the Nürburgring circuit.

500 cc race report
Wet race. Wayne Gardner on pole. Wayne Rainey took the first turn from Eddie Lawson, Pierfrancesco Chili, Christian Sarron, Kevin Schwantz (from the second row).

Sarron, considered a good wet rider, took the lead. At the end of lap one it was Sarron, Schwantz, Lawson, Kevin Magee, Rainey, and Chili. Schwantz moved into first, then it was Sarron, Magee, Lawson, and Rainey. Schwantz had a large lead. Magee went down. The track was drying slightly. Heading towards the last lap, Schwantz was looking ragged going through a chicane, but he held it together to the line.

500 cc classification

References

German motorcycle Grand Prix
German
German Motorcycle
Sport in Rhineland-Palatinate